HHTDD (hexanitrohexaazatricyclododecanedione) is a powerful but moisture sensitive explosive compound. It is essentially an open analogue of the cyclic nitroamine cage compounds such as CL-20. While it is highly explosive, with a velocity of detonation even higher than that of CL-20, HHTDD readily decomposes in the presence of even trace amounts of water, making it unsuitable for any practical applications.

See also
TNGU
2,4,6-Tris(trinitromethyl)-1,3,5-triazine
4,4’-Dinitro-3,3’-diazenofuroxan (DDF)
Heptanitrocubane
Octanitrocubane
RE factor

References

Explosive chemicals
Nitroamines